The Definitive Collection of Mini-LP Replica CDs Boxed Set is a twelve compact disc collection of albums by English rock group Led Zeppelin, distributed by Atlantic Records in conjunction with Rhino Entertainment on 4 November 2008. It contains all nine of the original Led Zeppelin studio albums digitally remastered, with the inclusion of previously unreleased tracks that had surfaced on the 1990 Boxed Set, on disc 12, as well as the two disc remastered edition of the film soundtrack The Song Remains the Same, which also includes bonus tracks. The albums are placed in chronological order, all with miniature replica sleeves of the original vinyl releases. Previous to this boxed set, these replica CDs were only available as individual releases from Japan. A Japanese deluxe boxed set was made available initially from 10 September 2008, limited to 5,000 copies on SHM-CD format.

The miniature replica sleeves have made all possible efforts to preserve the original artwork and functionality of the original vinyl releases. As such, the sleeves and CD labels only list what songs were originally released, omitting the bonus tracks from the packaging.


Track listing

Notes
(*) Includes five bonus tracks: "Black Dog" (with "Bring It On Home" intro), "Over the Hills and Far Away", "Misty Mountain Hop", "Since I've Been Loving You", and "The Ocean".
(**) Includes one bonus track: "Heartbreaker".
(***) Includes four bonus tracks: "Baby Come On Home", "Travelling Riverside Blues", "White Summer"/"Black Mountain Side", and "Hey, Hey, What Can I Do".

 The album is rated  G  in New Zealand.

Personnel

Led Zeppelin
John Bonham – drums, timpani, gong, backing vocals on Disc 1
John Paul Jones – bass guitar,  organ, keyboards, synthesizer, mandolin, recorders, harpsichord, Mellotron, backing vocals on Disc 1, acoustic guitar on "The Battle of Evermore"
Jimmy Page – acoustic, electric, and pedal steel guitar, banjo, theremin, backing vocals on Disc 1, mandolin on "The Battle of Evermore", production
Robert Plant – lead and overdubbed backing vocals, harmonica, acoustic guitar on "Boogie with Stu"

Additional musicians
Sandy Denny – vocals on "The Battle of Evermore"
Viram Jasani – tabla on "Black Mountain Side"
Ian Stewart – piano on "Rock and Roll" and "Boogie with Stu"

Production

Barrington Colby – illustrations
Peter Corriston – design and package concept
Cameron Crowe – liner notes
John C. F. Davis – remastering
Mike Doud – design and package concept
Chris Dreja – photography
Elliott Erwitt – photography
BP Fallon – photography
Peter Grant – executive producer on original recordings
Ross Halfin – photo research
George Hardie – cover design
Roy Harper – photography
Dave Heffernan – illustrations
David Juniper – artwork
Maurice Tate – photo tinting

Chart positions

Release history

References

External links
Rhino.com announcement

Albums produced by Jimmy Page
Led Zeppelin compilation albums
2008 compilation albums
Atlantic Records compilation albums
Rhino Entertainment compilation albums
Reissue albums
Albums recorded at A&M Studios
Albums recorded at Morgan Sound Studios
Albums recorded at Sunset Sound Recorders
Albums recorded at Polar Studios
Albums recorded at Electric Lady Studios